King Edward Peak is a mountain located north of Starvation Creek and the U.S. border in British Columbia, Canada. The mountain was named in 1915 after King Edward VII.

King Edward Peak should not be confused with Mt. King Edward, located on the Continental Divide farther north, although it too was named after King Edward.

References

Two-thousanders of British Columbia
Canadian Rockies
Kootenay Land District